In the run-up to the next Scottish Parliament election, various organisations are conducting opinion polls to gauge voting intentions. Results of such polls are displayed in this list. Most of the pollsters listed were members of the British Polling Council (BPC) and abided by its disclosure rules.

The date range for these opinion polls is from the previous Scottish Parliament election, held on 6 May 2021, to the next election, which can be held no later than 7 May 2026.

Constituency vote

Regional vote

Seat predictions 
Most polls are reported in terms of the overall popular vote share, and the pollsters do not typically project how these shares would equate to numbers of seats in the Scottish Parliament. Other organisations including Electoral Calculus make rolling projections based on an aggregate of publicly available polls. A small number of large polls have been carried out to run multilevel regression with poststratification (MRP) models, which output predictions for each constituency and electoral region.

See also
 Opinion polling for the next Senedd election
 Opinion polling for the 2021 Scottish Parliament election

Notes

References

General elections to the Scottish Parliament
2020s elections in Scotland
Scottish Parliament election
Opinion polling for United Kingdom votes in the 2020s